Alžbeta Bačíková (née Pavlendová; born 6 February 1990) is a Slovak professional racing cyclist. She rode at the 2013, 2014 and 2015 UCI Track Cycling World Championships.

Major results

Road
Source: 

2009
 1st  Time trial, National Road Championships
2010
 National Road Championships
1st  Time trial
2nd Road race
2011
 2nd Time trial, National Road Championships
2012
 1st  Time trial, National Road Championships
2013
 1st  Time trial, National Road Championships
2014
 3rd Road race, National Road Championships
2015
 National Road Championships
1st  Road race
2nd Time trial
2017
 1st  Road race, National Road Championships
 1st Horizon Park Women Challenge
2018
 National Road Championships
3rd Road race
3rd Time trial
2019
 1st  Road race, National Road Championships
 4th Horizon Park Women Challenge
 9th Chabany Race

Track

2013
 Grand Prix Vienna
2nd Keirin
2nd Scratch
2014
 1st Omnium, Grand Prix Vienna
 2nd Scratch, Grand Prix of Poland
 2nd Scratch, 3 Jours d'Aigle
2015
 Irish International Track GP
1st Points race
3rd Keirin
 2nd Scratch, Six Days of Bremen
 2nd Scratch, Panevėžys
 3rd Keirin, Fenioux Piste International
 3rd Scratch, 3 Jours d'Aigle
2016
 Grand Prix Vienna
2nd Scratch
3rd Points race
 2nd Scratch, Přilba Moravy
 3rd Scratch, Six Days of Bremen
2017
 2nd Scratch, Grand Prix Minsk
 3rd Scratch, Přilba Moravy
2021
 National Track Championships
1st  Elimination race
1st  Omnium
1st  Points race
1st  Scratch

References

External links
 

1990 births
Living people
Slovak female cyclists
Cyclists at the 2019 European Games
European Games competitors for Slovakia
Sportspeople from Krupina